Akansha Ranjan Kapoor (born 18 September 1993) is an Indian actress who primarily works in Hindi films. Kapoor made her film debut with Guilty (2020) for which she received a Filmfare OTT Awards nomination. She made her web debut with Netflix's series Ray (2021).

Early life
Kapoor was born on 18 September 1993 in Mumbai to Shashi Ranjan, an actor/director from FTII and the Publisher of GR8 Magazine and Anu Ranjan, the Founder of The Indian Television Academy. Her elder sister Anushka Ranjan is also an actress.

Akansha completed her schooling from Jamnabai Narsee School. After her schooling she received an acting diploma from Whistling Woods.

Career
Kapoor started her career in 2019 with the television fashion series, TLC's Decoded. She next appeared in the music video Tere Do Naina alongside Aparshakti Khurana.

In 2020, she made her film debut with the Netflix film Guilty where she was seen as a rape victim. She received Best Supporting Actor (Female) nomination for her performance.

Kapoor next made her web debut with the 2021 Netflix series Ray, where she was seen opposite Harshvardhan Kapoor. She next appeared in the music video "Hum Hi Hum The" alongside Aashim Gulati.
Kapoor next appeared alongside Rajkummar Rao, Radhika Apte and Huma Qureshi in Monica, O My Darling.

Filmography

Films

Television

Music videos

Awards and nominations

References

External links
 

1993 births
Living people
Indian film actresses
21st-century Indian actresses